Bush Hall is located at 310 Uxbridge Road, Shepherd's Bush, West London, England. Originally a dance hall, it is now an independent music venue with a capacity of 400.

Bush Hall was built in 1904. It was used as a soup kitchen during World War II, in the late 1950s and early 1960s as a bingo hall and rehearsal stage, and finally as a snooker and social club in the 1980s and 1990s. In 2001 it was restored as a music hall by its present owners, Charlie Raworth and Emma Hutchinson.

References

External links
 

Music venues in London
Shepherd's Bush